Hebeloma vinosophyllum is a toxic species of agaric fungus in the family Hymenogastraceae. It contains eleven poisonous compounds collectively known as hebevinosides.  An ammonia fungus, it tends to grow on the corpses of animals. The species was described by Japanese mycologist Tsuguo Hongo in 1965. It was recorded from Vietnamese Pinus kesiya forests in 2014, its first record in Southeast Asia.

See also
List of Hebeloma species

References

Ammonia fungi
Fungi described in 1965
Fungi of Asia
vinosophyllum